Barikot (Pashto: بریکوټ) is a town located in the middle course of the Swat River in Khyber Pakhtunkhwa, Pakistan. It is the entrance town to the central Swat Valley with a population of approximately 25,000 people.
The Italian Archaeological Mission (renamed ISMEO) founded by Giuseppe Tucci has been excavating ruins of the ancient town of Bazira under Barikot since 1984.

Excavations

It was thought the oldest layer under Barikot was a village which has been dated to 1100-1000 BC, but previous Chalcolithic pit structures are attested since 1700 BC. 

Early Iron Age proto-urban layers were found, and dated to eleventh-eight centuries BC, archaeologists also found that the fortified urban settlement in Barikot (lower area and acropolis) was established around mid-first millennium BC.

The excavations have discovered a number of artifacts which document the daily life of the residents, including coins, pottery and weapons.  Several large artifacts including, a large green-schist statue of Siddhartha Buddha riding his horse Kanthaka and a carving of a stupa with two lions, document the Buddhist history of Bazira.  Another statue depicting an unknown deity sitting on a throne, with long, curled hair, holding a wine goblet and a severed goat head in his hands may represent Dionysus, the Greek god of wine or another local deity.

Chalcolithic (c. 1700-1400 BC)

The first traces of human presence in Barikot are from ca. 1700 to 1400 BC, as per Giorgio Stacul (1987) findings, which he reported as belonging to Swat Period IV, these are pit remains attested since around 1700 BC.

Late Bronze/Iron Age (c. 1200-800 BC)

During excavation campaigns in 2016-2017, the Italian Archaeological Mission was able to identify the transitional phase from Late Bronze to Iron age, dating it c. 1200-800 BC. Excavations were performed in trench BKG 12 W, where archaeologists found, in Macrophase 1b, residential structures and workshops, along with a toy-cart, bi-carinated pottery, miniature vessels, stone tools, and incised pottery, all radiocarbon-dated between 1196 to 1021 BC (95.4% probability model).

During this time, c. 1200 to 800 BC, archaeological data show the presence of a large settlement (around 15 ha), including a hilltop acropolis, commented by Callieri et al. (2000), an inner stronghold, and an extensive outer graveyard.

Abandonment Phase (c. 800-500 BC)

After the Iron Age, the settlement suffered the collapse of its earthen rampart in Macrophase 1c, between c. 750 and 650 BC , the site was abandoned and alluvium covered the place in Interphase 1c/2a, between c. 650 and 500 BC.

The Beginning of the City and Achaemenid Acculturation Phase (c. 500-350 BC)

After the abandonment, the beginning of the city can be traced back archaeologically to Macrophase 2a1, between 500 and 450 BC, and Achaemenid acculturation phase to Macrophase 2a2, from 450 to 350 BC. This Achaemenid influence from 450 BC started in the Classic period of that Persian Empire. Archaeologists found, in this phase of Barikot, luxury pottery typical of the Achaemenids, but also saw the introduction of non-luxury Indic pottery, and many local glass objects.

Regionalization Phase (c. 350-250 BC)

Greek and Latin sources like Curtius Rufus, talking of this period, tell that Swat and Gandhara were not controlled by Achaemenids anymore (from around 350 BC), and that a tribe known as Assakenoi ruled the region allied to other Indian tribes. Italian Mission archaeologists consider this phase saw the complete disappearance of Achaemenid ceramic forms, but that household Indic vessels were still in use at Barikot. This belongs to archaeological Macrophase 2b, from c.350 to 250 BC, and Macedonian siege to Barikot (Bazira) occurred within this period, in autum 327 BC. Also during Macrophase 2b, in trench BKG 11, a Mauryan coin was found, radiocarbon dated to 349-282 BC (95.4% probability model), what is 315 +/- 34 BC.

Mauryan and Greco-Bactrian Kingdoms Linking Phase (c. 250-150 BC)

Beginning in 2011, an excavation in the south west corner of the site discovered several older settlements than expected. One pre-Indo-Greek level was dated to the mid 3rd century BC or in the middle of the Mauryan era. During this time, known archaeologically as Macrophase 3a1, Barikot was part of a political and commercial network linking Mauryan and Greco-Bactrian kingdoms, as both Greco-Bactrian and Hellenistic pottery forms were introduced in the site with clear relationships to northern Afghanistan and Central Asia, just like Ai-Khanoum.

Old Apsidal Temple

In December 2021, archaeologists of Ca’ Foscari University and Italian Archaeological Mission in collaboration with the provincial department of archaeology and museums in Pakistan, led by Dr. Luca Maria Olivieri, announced the discovery of the earliest Buddhist apsidal temple in Barikot (the ancient Bazira). They claim it was constructed in the times of Ashoka's reign in Mauryan period, around 250 BC. It was also found that this structure was still in function during the reign of Menander I, the Indo-Greek king, in the mid-second century BC, but even though it was enhanced in later times, it came to an end around the third or fourth century of the Common Era, as the city was abandoned by the Kushan rulers of the time due to an earthquake. This is the earliest apsidal temple found in Pakistan until now, and is a revolutionary discovery also because it proves the presence of Buddhism in Swat since the 3rd century BC, and confirms that Menander I, known as Milinda by early Buddhists, supported this cult.

“We have found coins, among which a silver specimen issued by King Menander, an onyx-made seal decorated with a Hellenistic intaglio depicting the image of a youth in Greek attire with a Kharosthi inscription, a monumental Kharosthi epigraph, many other Kharosthi inscriptions on pots, and potsherds belonging to the Indo-Greek cultural horizon such as fish plates and polished black pottery that imitates Attic models,” said the archaeologist Dr Michele Minardi, member of the Italian mission.

Indo-Greek Phase (c. 150-100 BC)

The Italian expeditions in the 1980s and 90s discovered an Indo-Greek town from around the time of King Menander I in the 2nd century BC. The 2nd century BC town covered, at its peak, an area of about  including the acropolis, or about  without.  It was surrounded by a defensive wall with massive rectangular bastions. This defensive wall, constructed around Barikot during the Indo-Greek phase belongs to Macrophase 3a2, after 150 BC, as per 2016-2017 excavations by the same Italian mission when this wall, massive and imposing, was dated by numismatic findings and radiocarbon analysis.

Kushan Times

Under the Kushan Empire it grew into a major town before a series of earthquakes in the 3rd century AD devastated it.  Probably due to the damage from the earthquakes as well as the decline of the Kushan Empire, Bazira was abandoned by the end of the 3rd century.

Turk Shahi Times

Turk Shahi was a Kabul-based Turkic dynasty which also ruled Swat Valley (from 7th to 9th centuries AD), so members of the Italian Archaeological Mission in Pakistan were able to find a unique temple from this period, built in Barikot, on the top of Ghwandai mound. It's an important discovery as there are few cultic centres in this region belonging to Shahi periods in general. Dr. Luca Maria Olivieri said the temple was built around 700 AD., by that time Uddiyana (Swat Valley) was ruled by a king known as "From Kesar", who was the son of Khurasan Tegin Shah, a well-known Turk Shahi king from Kabul, and that the temple was re-established and maintained till the Hindu Shahi time (ca 1000 AD). The temple is also mentioned in a Hindu Shahi inscription, found in Barikot in the late 19th century and conserved in Lahore Museum.

References

External links

Report of the Italian Archaeological Mission (Pdf, Italian)

Populated places in Swat District
Cities in Khyber Pakhtunkhwa
Archaeological sites in Khyber Pakhtunkhwa
Populated places along the Silk Road
Stupas in Pakistan
Indo-Aryan archaeological sites